The National Socialist Legion (NSL) is an American neo-nazi hate group. The group split off from Vanguard America in January 2018 due to accusations of ineffective leadership and infighting. The NSL has been active in around eight U.S. states, mainly distributing propaganda. According to the Anti-Defamation League, the group describes itself as a "revolutionary National Socialist organization" preparing for "the coming Racial Holy War." New members of the NSL are purportedly required to read white supremacist texts, including The Turner Diaries and Siege.

References 

2018 establishments in the United States
Organizations established in 2018
Anti-Zionism in the United States
Alt-right organizations
Neo-Nazi organizations in the United States